Xinqiao is a town under the administration of Zhangping City in mountainous southwestern Fujian province, China, located  north-northeast of downtown Zhangping. , it has 2 residential communities and 23 villages under its administration.

See also 
 List of township-level divisions of Fujian

References 

Township-level divisions of Fujian